Oberarzt (short: OArzt or OA), literally meaning "senior physician," in English known as first lieutenant (Dr.), was a military commissioned officer rank in the Austro-Hungarian Common Army until 1918, and in the German Reichswehr and Wehrmacht until 1945.

It describes a qualified or licensed surgeon or dentist with a rank equal to 1st lieutenant (de: Oberleutnant) or sub-lieutenant lieutenant (de: Oberleutant zur See) NATO-Rangcode OF1a in anglophone armed forces.

While holders of this rank were commissioned officers, their authority was usually limited to medical matters and medical staff, and they were regarded as non-combatants and accorded the status of "protected persons" under international humanitarian law when participating in humanitarian work during armed conflicts. As such, they could not be attacked, harmed or taken as prisoners of war, and were entitled under the Geneva Conventions to carry out their work without being inhibited.

During the German airborne invasion of Crete, 20 May 1941, one military medical doctor (Oberarzt Doctor Neumann) took command of the first battalion of the Parachute Storm Regiment when all other officers were killed or wounded. He commanded the battalion during the first assault oh Hill 107.

Germany

Wehrmacht
In the German Wehrmacht from 1933 until 1945 there were the OF1a-ranks Oberarzt (physician), Oberapotheker (pharacologis), and Oberveterinär (veterinary), comparable to the Oberleutnant/First lieutenant OF2a-rank.

During wartime, the regular assignment of Oberarzt was the management of a battalion dressing station (de. Truppenverbandsplatz), supported by second lieutenants (Dr.), and help surgeons (de: Assistenz-, and Hilfsärzte). However, a battalion dressing station could be managed by an Assistenzarzt (OF1b) as well.

In line to the so-called Reichsbesoldungsordnung (en: Reich's salary order), appendixes to the Salary law of the German Empire (de: Besoldungsgesetz des Deutschen Reiches) of 1927 (changes 1937 – 1940), the comparative ranks were as follows: C 8/C 9
Oberleutnant, Leutnant (Heer and Luftwaffe)
Leutnant
Oberleutnant zur See (Kriegsmarine)
Leutnant zur See
Oberarzt (medical service of the Wehrmacht)
Assistenzarzt
Marineoberassistenzarzt, introduced June 26, 1935 (medical service of the Kriegsmarine)
Marineassistenzarzt
Oberveterinär (veterinarian service of the Wehrmacht)
Veterinär

The corps colour of the military Health Service Support (HSS) in German armed forces was traditional dark blue, and of the veterinarian service . This tradition was continued by the medical service corps in Heer and Luftwaffe of the Reichswehr and Wehrmacht.

Address
The manner of formal addressing of military surgeons/dentists with the rank Oberarzt was, "err Oberarzt"; with the rank Marineoberarzt - "Herr Marineoberarzt".

Austria-Hungary
In the Austria-Hungarian Common Army (de: Gemeinsame Armee or k.u.k. Armee) there were the OF1a-ranks Oberarzt and Obertierarz until 1918. That particular ranks were comparable to the Oberleutnant/1st lieutenant OF1-rank as well.

References

Military ranks of Germany
Military of Austria
Austro-Hungarian Army